The women's 48 kg judo event at the 2015 European Games in Baku was held on 25 June at the Heydar Aliyev Arena.

Results

Final

Repechage

Top half

Bottom half

References

External links
 
 

W48
2015
European W48